In economics and game theory, an all-pay auction is an auction in which every bidder must pay regardless of whether they win the prize, which is awarded to the highest bidder as in a conventional auction. As shown by Riley and Samuelson (1981), equilibrium bidding in an all pay auction with private information is revenue equivalent to bidding in a sealed high bid or open ascending price auction.

In the simplest version, there is complete information. The Nash equilibrium is such that each bidder plays a mixed strategy and expected pay-offs are zero. The seller's expected revenue is equal to the value of the prize. However, some economic experiments and studies have shown that over-bidding is common. That is, the seller's revenue frequently exceeds that of the value of the prize, in hopes of securing the winning bid. In repeated games even bidders that win the prize frequently will most likely take a loss in the long run.

The all-pay auction with complete information does not have a Nash equilibrium in pure strategies, but does have a Nash equilibrium in mixed-strategies.

Forms of all-pay auctions
Several types of all-pay auctions exist; the most common form is a raffle. During a raffle, an object is placed up for bid. Each person pays to bid on the item, which in most cases involves buying a raffle ticket. Only one of the ticket holders, or bidders, will win the item.

Similarly, a lottery is another form of an all-pay auction since each person who purchases a lottery ticket is paying for a chance to win. However, unlike the standard all-pay auction, some lotteries award more than one winner.

The most straightforward form of an all-pay auction is a Tullock auction, sometimes called a Tullock lottery after Gordon Tullock, in which everyone submits a bid but both the losers and the winners pay their submitted bids. This is instrumental in describing certain ideas in public choice economics.

One of the examples is the United States Housing and Urban Development (HUD) grants. Cities vie for these grants to get money to improve public parks, develop housing projects for the poor, maintain rail systems, etc. HUD reviews the grant applications very carefully to ensure that only the city with the best application gets the money. Ideally, no city will spend money trying to get the grant, so the entire value of the grant is obtained for ‘free’. Now, if a well-meaning councilman wants his city to win a $5 million grant, he might not mind paying $1 million to hire people to write the grant application well. This money will come out of taxes and public funds, but if it helps the city win the grant, there is $4 million to be gained. What if there are 10 cities that think this way? All 10 cities will take $1million out of public funds – $10 million. Only 1 city wins the $5 million grant. Net result: $5 million of tax-payers money is lost. In fact, according to the podcast, nearly a quarter of the grant money that cities win is spent trying to obtain the grant in the first place. Presumably the same amount is spent by cities that don’t win the grant. These cities would like to get the grants for free, but the competition inherent in the HUD evaluation means that they have to engage in a Tullock auction and risk running losses in order to win.

The dollar auction is a two player Tullock auction, or a multiplayer game in which only the two highest bidders pay their bids. Another practical example is the bidding fee auction, also known as “penny auction”.

Other forms of all-pay auctions exist, such as a war of attrition (also known as biological auctions). An example is a second price all-pay auction, in which the highest bidder wins, but all (or more typically, both) bidders pay only the lower bid.  The war of attrition is used by biologists to model conventional contests, or agonistic interactions resolved without recourse to physical aggression.

The all pay auction is widely used in economics because it captures the essential elements of contests. It has been used to model (1) the lobbying for rents in regulated and trade protected industries, (2) technological competition and R&D races, and (3) a host of other situations including political campaigns, tournaments and job promotion. Essentially, these economic problems boil down to a contest that is an all-pay auction in effort; the player putting forth the greatest efforts the prize, while the efforts of other contestants go unrewarded.

Rules 
The following analysis follows a few basic rules.

 Each bidder submits a bid, which only depends on their valuation.  
 Bidders do not know the valuations of other bidders.  
 The analyses are based on an independent private value (IPV) environment where the valuation of each bidder is drawn independently from a uniform distribution [0,1]. In the IPV environment, if my value is 0.6 then the probability that some other bidder has a lower value is also 0.6.

Symmetry Assumption 
In IPV bidders are symmetric because valuations are from the same distribution. These make the analysis focus on symmetric and monotonic bidding strategies. This implies that two bidders with the same valuation will submit the same bid. As a result, under symmetry, the bidder with the highest value will always win.

Using revenue equivalence to predict bidding function 
Consider the two-player version of the all-pay auction and  be the private valuations independent and identically distributed on a uniform distribution from [0,1]. We wish to find a monotone increasing bidding function, that forms a symmetric Nash Equilibrium.

Note that if player  bids , he wins the auction only if his bid is larger than player 's bid . The probability for this to happen is

, since  is monotone and 

.

Upon integrating, we get .

We know that if player  has private valuation , then they will bid 0;  . We can use this to show that the constant of integration is also 0.

Thus, we get .

Since this function is indeed monotone increasing, this bidding strategy  constitutes a Bayesian-Nash Equilibrium. The revenue from the all-pay auction in this example is

Since   are drawn iid from Unif[0,1], the expected  revenue is

.

Due to the revenue equivalence theorem, all auctions with 2 players will have an expected revenue of  when the private valuations are iid from Unif[0,1].

Examples 
Consider a corrupt official who is dealing with campaign donors: Each wants him to do a favor that is worth somewhere between $0 and $1000 to them (uniformly distributed). Their actual valuations are $250, $500 and $750. They can only observe their own valuations. They each treat the official to an expensive present - if they spend X Dollars on the present then this is worth X dollars to the official. The official can only do one favor and will do the favor to the donor who is giving him the most expensive present.

This is a typical model for all-pay auction. To calculate the optimal bid for each donor, we need to normalize the valuations {250, 500, 750} to {0.25, 0.5, 0.75} so that IPV may apply.

According to the formula for optimal bid:

The optimal bids for three donors under IPV are:

To get the real optimal amount that each of the three donors should give, simply multiplied the IPV values by 1000:

This example implies that the official will finally get $375 but only the third donor, who donated $281.3 will win the official's favor. Note that the other two donors know their valuations are not high enough (low chance of winning),  so they do not donate much, thus balancing the possible huge winning profit and the low chance of winning.

References

Non-cooperative games
Types of auction
Mathematical economics